Turbo is a Czech rock band founded in 1981, which has been described as "legends of Czech rock". Their most popular songs are: „Hráč“, „Chtěl jsem mít“, „Je to jízda“, „Krásným dívkám“, „Přestáváš snít“, „Láska z pasáží“.

Members

Members in 2013

 Mirek Chrástka
 Martin Laul
 Jirka Lang
 Petr „Bob“ Šťastný

Former members
 Richard Kybic
 Jiří Vondráček
 Jiří Lang
 Ladislav Rýdl
 Martin Laul
 Pavel Bady Zbořil
 Jiří "Bavr" Lokajíček
 Jaroslav Želínský
 Miloslav Orcígr

Discography

Albums

 Turbo (1984)
 Heavy Waters (1985)
 To bude pánové jízda (1985)
 Hráč (1987)
 Turbo 88 (1988)
 Parta (1989)
 Jsou stále v nás (2001)
 Návrat králů (2005)

Singles

 Sedm dni / Divka s modryma ocima (1981)
 Tak co čekáš / Takhle se k výškám jde (1982)
 Přestáváš snít / Amore, při mě stůj (1982)
 Další ráno / Měsíc (1983)
 Díky, já jdu dál / Růžový kavalír (1983)
 Chtěl jsem mít / Tak jsem byl zase jednou druhej (1985)
 Hráč / Komu se nelení (1987)
 Vodopád prázdných slov / Navždy "Goodbye" (1988)
 Láska z pasáží / Sáro (1989)
 Kdo z nás je vinný / Andrománie (1989)

References

 http://rateyourmusic.com/artist/turbo_f1

External links
 Official homepage of Turbo
 Fanklub – http://fanklub-turbo.jex.cz/
  Skupina Turbo ´vychováva´ už tretiu generáciu fanúšikov... – www.music.box.sk
 Rozhovor v Korzári – 2003

Czech rock music groups
Musical groups established in 1981
1981 establishments in Czechoslovakia